HD 134335 is a giant star in the northern constellation of Boötes.

References

External links
 HR 5640
 CCDM J15086 +2507
 Image HD 134335

Boötes
134335
Double stars
074096
K-type giants
5640
Durchmusterung objects